Cédric Mongongu (born 22 June 1989) is a Congolese professional footballer who plays as a centre back for the DR Congo national team.

Club career
Mongongu began playing for his local club in La Garenne-Colombes before joining RCF Paris in 2002.

Monaco
He proceeded to join the Centre of Formation at Monaco in 2005 before making his first appearance in a 1–1 draw with Saint-Étienne on 4 August 2007. On 3 July 2009, he signed his first professional contract with Monaco. He went on to make a total of 92 appearances for the club.

In 2011, Mongongu joined Evian, making his debut on 21 September 2011 against Marseille. In 2015, he joined Eskişehirspor. After only one match his contract was terminated in January 2016.

International career
Mongongu chose to represent the country of his birth at international level DR Congo.

Personal life
Mongongu was born in Kinshasa, Zaire, but moved to France as a child growing up in La Garenne-Colombes, Hauts-de-Seine.

Honors

National
DR Congo
Africa Cup of Nations bronze:2015

References

External links
 
 
 
 
 
 

1989 births
Living people
Footballers from Kinshasa
French footballers
Democratic Republic of the Congo footballers
Democratic Republic of the Congo international footballers
Association football midfielders
AS Monaco FC players
Thonon Evian Grand Genève F.C. players
Eskişehirspor footballers
Montpellier HSC players
Ligue 1 players
2013 Africa Cup of Nations players
2015 Africa Cup of Nations players
21st-century Democratic Republic of the Congo people